Spodnje Koseze is a village south of Lukovica pri Domžalah in the eastern part of the Upper Carniola region of Slovenia.

Church
The local church, dedicated to Saint Lawrence, stands in Gorenje, which was a separate settlement until 1955.

Notable people
Notable people that were born or lived in Spodnje Koseze include:
 Janez Vesel (a.k.a. Ivan Vesel, Jovan Koseski, 1798–1884), poet

References

External links

Spodnje Koseze on Geopedia

Populated places in the Municipality of Lukovica